Mino Milani (3 February 1928 – 10 February 2022) was an Italian writer, cartoonist, journalist and historian. During his career he also used several pseudonyms, including  Stelio Martelli, Eugenio Ventura, Piero Selva, Mungo Graham Alcesti and T. Maggio.

Life and career 
Born in Pavia, Milani debuted as a writer in 1952 and wrote over two hundred books, spanning children's and adult novels, collections of short stories, biographies and historical books. Among his best known works, the giallo-crime novel cycle featuring police commissioner Melchiorre Ferrari, the series of western novels Tommy River, and Fantasma d'amore, a novel adapted into a film with the same name by Dino Risi, starring Marcello Mastroianni and Romy Schneider. Milani was also well known as a comic writer, mainly active for Corriere dei Piccoli and Corriere dei Ragazzi, whose collaborations include Hugo Pratt, Milo Manara, Sergio Toppi, Dino Battaglia, Arturo del Castillo, Mario Uggeri,  Grazia Nidasio, Attilio Micheluzzi.

As a journalist, Milano worked for important publications such as Corriere della Sera and La Domenica del Corriere, and was editor-in-chief of the daily newspaper La Provincia Pavese. He died in Pavia on 10 February 2022, at the age of 94.

References

External links 

 Mino Milani at Goodreads
 Mino Milani at Open Library
 

1928 births
2022 deaths
20th-century Italian journalists
21st-century Italian journalists
Italian comics writers
People from Pavia